The Daniel K. Inouye Asia-Pacific Center for Security Studies (DKI APCSS) is a U.S. Department of Defense institute that officially opened Sept. 4, 1995, in Honolulu, Hawaii. The Center addresses regional and global security issues, inviting military and civilian representatives of the United States and Asia-Pacific nations to its comprehensive program of executive reeducation and workshops, both in Hawaii and throughout the Asia-Pacific region.

The Center supports the U.S. Pacific Command by developing and sustaining relationships among security practitioners and national security establishments throughout the region. DKI APCSS’ mission is to build capacities and communities of interest by educating, connecting, and empowering security practitioners to advance Asia-Pacific security. It is one of the Department of Defense’s five regional security studies centers.

The Center focuses on Executive Education via both resident and regional events. These academic events include resident courses and outreach events such as mini-courses, conferences and research projects. Senior military and government decision-makers in security-related positions from throughout the region participate in APCSS courses. The Daniel K. Inouye Asia-Pacific Center for Security Studies is located on Fort DeRussy, in Waikiki, Hawaii.

Background 
U.S. Senator Daniel Inouye, after visiting the George C. Marshall European Center for Security Studies, felt the Asia-Pacific region could benefit from an executive education and conference program. In 1994 Inouye introduced congressional language to establish the Asia-Pacific Center for Security Studies in Hawaii. The language instructed the Navy to use $3 million of existing budgeted funds and create the Center as a direct reporting unit to Commander USPACOM.

On Sept. 4, 1995, APCSS was officially established during a ceremony at the Hilton Hawaiian Village in Honolulu. William J. Perry, then U.S. Secretary of Defense and General John Shalikashvili, Chairman of the Joint Chiefs of Staff, joined Admiral Richard C. Macke, Commander USPACOM and 33 foreign dignitaries opening the center.

DoD Directive 5200.38 giving official authorization to the Center was signed Jan. 29, 1996.

In October 1995, the center moved from Camp Smith into the Waikiki Trade Center in Hawaii.

History
The first 12-week Executive Course began in September 1996 with 23 fellows from 12 countries. A total of ten executive courses and two senior executive courses were conducted at the Waikiki Trade Center.
   
In June, 2000, APCSS moved into its present home at Fort DeRussy. Formerly the home of the 9th Army Reserve Command, buildings were refurbished to house the center. An existing warehouse was converted into an auditorium and classroom and office spaces.

On August 23, 2000, the building was officially dedicated, with more than 300 VIPs and special guests in attendance. Speakers included: Senator Inouye, Admiral Dennis C. Blair Commander USPACOM, William Perry, former Secretary of Defense and Lt. Gen. H.C. Stackpole (USMC RET) APCSS president.

In September 2015, APCSS celebrated its 20th anniversary and officially changed its name from the Asia-Pacific Center for Security Studies to the Daniel K. Inouye Asia-Pacific Center for Security Studies.

Current
Today the Center is made up of 128 staff and faculty and is composed of civilians and active duty military, which are drawn from all branches of the U.S. Armed Forces. The multi-cultural diversity of the Center’s student body is replicated by its international staff and faculty.

Resident Programs 
Resident programs include:
 Transnational Security Cooperation
 Advanced Security Cooperation Course
 Comprehensive Security Responses to Terrorism Course
 Comprehensive Crisis Management
 Indo-Pacific Orientation Course
 Comprehensive Security Cooperation Course (beginning in Spring 2022)

Outreach: Resident & Regional 

 Focused Outreach Events – APCSS staff and faculty routinely travel throughout the Asia-Pacific region to conduct mini-courses, conferences and research that address specific needs identified by host nation and U.S. Embassy officials. Examples include workshops on: Civil-Military Relations, Crisis Management, UN Peacekeeping, Counter Terrorism, etc.
 Workshops - APCSS’ workshop program is a forum for key regional interagency, multinational security policy drafters and decision makers to develop cooperative approaches to these problems. Examples include: Influenza pandemic, Maritime Security, Women, Peace and Security, and Security Sector Governance.
 Research- APCSS faculty members conduct research and publish various publications available on their website.

Alumni relations and notable alumni
APCSS has more than 15,000 graduates.

Alumni in Senior Positions include:
 President (4) 
 Vice President/Deputy PM (3)
 Minister/Deputy Minister (35)
 Ambassador (151)
 Chief or Deputy Chief of Defense (15)
 Chief or Deputy Chief of Service (43)
 Cabinet or Parliament appointment (36)
 Advisor to Pres/King/Cabinet (29)

Alumni associations
APCSS has more than 57 alumni associations.

Other regional centers
APCSS is one of five regional centers that fall under the Defense Security Cooperation Agency.
The other centers include:
The George C. Marshall European Center for Security Studies 
The Africa Center for Strategic Studies
 William J. Perry Center for Hemispheric Defense Studies
 Near East South Asia Center for Strategic Studies

References

External links
 APCSS Website
 APCSS Faculty Research & Publications
 "Contributing to Regional Security Capacity" - Joint Forces Quarterly
 10 USC 184 Regional Centers
  Star Advertiser Op-Ed
 APCSS celebrates 15th anniversary with new wing groundbreaking

Security studies
United States Department of Defense agencies
Buildings and structures in Honolulu
Education in Honolulu
1995 establishments in Hawaii